The pop group ABBA (1972-1982) exerted a strong influence on other pop musicians with many of their songs covered by other artist and at least 25 tribute albums ranging from symphony orchestras to heavy metal groups.

Notes

Lists of tribute albums